BCES may stand for:

Education 
Bridlewood Community Elementary School - An elementary school located in Kanata, Ottawa, Ontario, Canada.

British Counselling & Educational Services.

Emergency services 
Botetourt County Emergency Services - The fire and rescue department located in Botetourt County, Virginia.